Adhimoksha (Sanskrit, also adhimokṣa; Pali: adhimokkha; Tibetan Wylie: mos pa) is a Buddhist term that is translated as "interest", "intensified interest", or "decision". It is defined as holding onto a certain form object; its function is not to lose the object.  

Within the Buddhist Abhidharma teachings, adhimoksha is identified as follows:
 One of the six occasional mental factors within the Theravada Abhidharma teachings
 One of the five object-determining mental factors within the Mahayana Abhidharma teachings

Explanation

Theravada
The Visuddhimagga ( XIV, 151) gives the following definition of adhimokkha:

The act of resolving is resolution. It has the characteristic of conviction. Its function is not to grope. It is manifested as decisiveness. Its proximate cause is a thing to be convinced about. It should be regarded as like a boundary-post owing to its immovableness with regard to the object.

Bhikkhu Bodhi explains:
The word adhimokkha means literally the releasing of the mind onto the object. Hence it has been rendered decision or resolution. It has the characteristic of conviction, the function of not groping, and manifestation as decisiveness. Its proximate cause is a thing to be convinced about. It is compared to a stone pillar owing to its unshakable resolve regarding the object.

Mahayana
The Abhidharma-samuccaya states: 

What is intensified interest? It is to stick to the determined thing just as it has been determined, and the function of intensified interest is that it cannot be taken away.

Herbert Guenther states:
 It is an awareness by which one stays with what the mind [yul-can] has logically established as this is so and not otherwise.

See also
 Mental factors (Buddhism)

References

Sources
 Berzin, Alexander (2006), Primary Minds and the 51 Mental Factors
 Bhikkhu Bodhi (2003), A Comprehensive Manual of Abhidhamma, Pariyatti Publishing
 Guenther, Herbert V. &  Leslie S. Kawamura (1975), Mind in Buddhist Psychology: A Translation of Ye-shes rgyal-mtshan's "The Necklace of Clear Understanding" Dharma Publishing. Kindle Edition.
 Kunsang, Erik Pema (translator) (2004). Gateway to Knowledge, Vol. 1. North Atlantic Books.
 Nina van Gorkom (2010), Cetasikas, Zolag

External links
 Ranjung Yeshe wiki entry for mos pa
 Berzin Archives glossary entry for "mos pa"

Mental factors in Buddhism